Enrique Iglesias: 95/08 Éxitos is a compilation album by Spanish singer songwriter Enrique Iglesias. Includes his seventeen number-one singles in the Billboard Hot Latin Tracks and two new songs, "¿Dónde Están Corazón?" and "Lloro Por Ti", both written by Enrique Iglesias and Coti Sorokin. The album's two singles "¿Dónde Están Corazón?" and "Lloro Por Tí" became his 18th and 19th number one singles on the Hot Latin Songs, achieving more number ones than any other artist in the history of the chart.

The album is released in two formats, standard edition with twelve number-one singles, plus two new songs, and the deluxe edition with seventeen number-one singles, two new songs, a DVD with eight music videos and an interview recorded during the worldwide tour Insomniac.

On 6 May 2008 the RIAA certified the album Double Platino in the United States. It was also certified Platinum in Russia. 95/08 Éxitos won the Lo Nuestro Award for Pop Album of the Year.

Track listing

Deluxe edition track listing
 Experiencia Religiosa – 1995
 Si Tú Te Vas – 1995
 Por Amarte – 1995
 No Llores Por Mí 1995
 Trapecista – 1997
 Enamorado Por Primera Vez – 1997
 Sólo En Ti – 1997
 Miente – 1998
 Esperanza – 1998
 Nunca Te Olvidaré – 1998
 Bailamos – 1999
 Ritmo Total – 2000
 Héroe – 2001
 Mentiroso / La Chica de Ayer (Spanish Edition) – 2002
 Para Qué La Vida – 2002
 Quizás – 2002
 Dímelo – 2007
 ¿Dónde Están Corazón? – 2008
 Lloro Por Ti – 2008
DVD
 Bailamos (Remix) – 1999
 Ritmo Total (Rhythm Divine) – 2000
 Héroe – 2001
 Escapar – 2001
 Mentiroso – 2002
 Dímelo – 2006
 Alguien Soy Yo – 2007
 Dónde Están Corazón? – 2008
 Interview with Enrique Iglesias

Charts

Weekly charts

Year-end charts

Sales and certifications

References

Enrique Iglesias compilation albums
Enrique Iglesias video albums
2008 greatest hits albums
2008 video albums
Music video compilation albums
Universal Music Latino compilation albums
Universal Music Latino video albums
Compilation albums of number-one songs